The Iloilo Accord is an academic consortium between three Philippine universities: the Central Philippine University, Silliman University, and Trinity University of Asia.  Historically, these universities have regarded each other as sister schools having been founded by American Protestant missionaries belonging to three denominations: Baptists, Presbyterians, and the Episcopalians (the latter in local partnership with Aglipayans). Funded by the United Board for Christian Higher Education in Asia (UBCHEA), its aims are laid out as follows:

References

External links
 Central Philippine University Official website
 Silliman University Official website
 Trinity University of Asia Official website

Christian universities and colleges
Higher education in the Philippines